A chantry is a monetary trust fund established by pre-Reformation English churches.

Chantry may also refer to:

 Art Chantry (born 1954), American graphic designer
 Chantry, Devon, a location in England
 Chantry, Ontario, Canada
 Chantry, Somerset, a hamlet in Somerset, England
 Chantry, Suffolk, an area of Ipswich, Suffolk, England
 Chantry Park, a public park in Ipswich, Suffolk, England
 The Chantry (Ipswich), a former mansion and current neurological care centre in Ipswich, Suffolk, England

See also
 Chantry Island (disambiguation)
 Chantrey (disambiguation)